Mobil Composition of  Matter (MCM)  is the initial name given for a series of mesoporous materials that were first synthesized by Mobil's researchers in 1992. MCM-41 (Mobil Composition of Matter No. 41) and MCM-48 (Mobil Composition of Matter No. 48) are two of the most popular mesoporous molecular sieves that are keenly studied by researchers.

The most striking fact about the MCM-41 and MCM-48 is that, although composed of amorphous silica wall, they possess long range ordered framework with uniform mesopores.  These materials also possess large surface area, which can be up to more than 1000 m2g−1.  Moreover, the pore diameter of these materials can be nicely controlled within mesoporous range between 1.5 and 20 nm by adjusting the synthesis conditions and/or by employing surfactants with different chain lengths in their preparation.

MCM-41 and MCM-48 have been applied as catalysts for various chemical reactions, as a support for drug delivery system and as adsorbent in waste water treatment.

MCM-41 is a material similar to FSM-16.

References

 Kresge, C. T., Leonowicz, M. E., Roth, W. J., Vartuli, J. C. and Beck, J. S. Nature, 1992. 359: 710-712.
 Beck, J.S., Vartuli, J. C., Roth, W. J., Leonowicz, M. E., Kresge, C. T., Schmitt, K. D., Chu, C. T. D., Olson, D. H., Sheppard, E. W., McCullen, S. B., Higgins, J. B. and Schlenker, J. L. J. Am. Chem. Soc., 1992. 114: 10834-10843.
 Beck, J. S. U.S. Patent 5, 057, 296. 1991.
 Huo, Q., Margolese, D. I., Ciesla, U., Denuth, D. G., Feng, P., Gier, T. E., Sieger, P., Firouzi, A., Chmelka, B. F., Schuth, F. and Stucky, G. D. Chem. Mater.., 1994. 6: 1176-1191.
 Choma, J., Pikus, S. and Jaroniec, M. Appl. Surf. Sci., 2005. 252: 562-569.
 Hamoudi, S. and Belkacemi, K. J. Porous Mater., 2004. 11: 47-54.

Materials
Catalysts